Kells A.R.L.F.C. is an amateur rugby league football club based in Kells, Whitehaven. The club's first team plays in the National Conference League.

Kells Amateur Rugby League Football Club were first formed in 1931, and played in the Cumberland League winning every trophy for a number of years. Kells left the Cumberland League in 2012 to start life in division 3 of the national conference and won division 3 and division 2 at the first attempt. Kells are known as the amateur challenge cup kings making excellent progress in the competition's history Kells have recently been crowned national conference division one winners – their third national conference title in as many years. The backbone being built at Kells is extraordinary and Kells going into the premier conference 2016 as favourites and will make history if they can be the first team to win four consecutive league titles in as many years.

The current Kells Amateur Rugby League Club can trace its origins back to 1931. Legend has it that the teams after match washing facilities consisted of buckets of water in the back yard of East Row overlooking the field. These rather spartan arrangements were dramatically improved when the club obtained the use of Haig Pit baths and from that time a bond was secured between club & mine, which continued unbroken until the closure of the colliery.

History

The club made an inauspicious start and did not achieve any notable successes during the 1930s, in fact the club ceased to function when it was disbanded for the duration of World War Two. On the cessation of hostilities, Kells Centre Amateur Rugby League Club was reformed and immediately achieved success. On 3 February 1946, Kells were drawn against the mighty ‘Wire’ of Warrington in a Rugby League Challenge Cup 1st round tie. The early rounds in those days were two-legged affairs and in the first match played at the Recreation Ground, Kells lost by the narrowest of margins, 3–0. In the return game at Wilderspool they lost the game 27–0. With the advent of a professional club in Whitehaven, many Kells players graduated to the paid ranks. In the late fifties Kells again reached the first round of the Challenge Cup drawing the powerful Hunslet side Parkside, losing 55–9. In 1965 Kells again qualified for a place in the Challenge Cup but due to a mix up, were not registered at Rugby League headquarters & were exempt from the draw. Towards the end of the seventies Kells made two important developments which in retrospect perhaps account for their pre-eminence today, the set up of their youth system & the building of their own club house & changing rooms, which opened in 1980, thereby breaking their long established links with Haig Colliery. The eighties saw this youth policy starting to pay dividends as Kells Under 19's appeared in two consecutive BARLA National Cup Finals.

Unfortunately success eluded them on both occasions. Also the Open Age team made it to the final of the BARLA National Cup on the same day as the Under 19's, also to lose out on the day. The decade saw Kells achieve greater success, dominating the BARLA Cumbria Cup & another three appearances in Rugby League Challenge Cup. In 1986 they lost out narrowly to Hunslet at Elland Road, while twelve months later drew 4–4 with Fulham at the Recreation Ground before losing the replay at Chiswick. They then played Leeds the year after at Whitehaven going down 28–0 in front of 6000 fans. These games however enhanced the reputation of the Kells club & indeed the amateur game as a whole.

While the nineties were perhaps not as productive at open age as the club would have wished, the youth & junior scene thrived and the professional game benefitted greatly with numerous young players progressing in to the professional game with David Seeds, Craig Chambers, Lee Kiddie & Graham Morton to name but a few. Kells made a positive start to the new millennium, with a number of youngsters touring New Zealand & Australia at BARLA Under 18 level. The successful Kells production line has continued to produce talent over the years, talent which enabled them to dominate the local rugby scene on a regular basis, winning the Cumberland Division One title on 3 occasions out of the last 4 seasons & the BARLA Cumbria Cup for the last 4 seasons, claiming many other cup competition victories en route, culminating in Kells’ two open age teams winning 6 out of the 9 trophies available in 2012 & losing in 2 other cup finals. Kells also produced many youngsters that have gone on to represent BARLA & the Community Lions, indeed the current squad boasts no less than six BARLA & Community Lions internationals in Scott Lofthouse, David Lowery, Ross Gainford, Danny Rowell, Ben Milburn & Connor Holiday. The 2013 season saw Kells embark on a new venture entering the National Conference league which resulted in the team being crowned division 3 champions and gaining promotion to division 2 at the 1st attempt. The 2nd also team continued where they left off in 2012 winning 2 of the 3 trophies on offer in the Cumberland league.

Notable players
Gregg McNally
Edward Bowman
Arnold Walker
Paul Charlton
Jordan Johnstone

Honours
 National Conference League Division One
 Winners (1): 2015
 National Conference League Division Two
 Winners (1): 2014
 National Conference League Division Three
 Winners (1): 2013
 BARLA Cumbria Cup
Winners (10): 1982–83, 1983–84, 1985–86, 1986–87, 1987–88, 1991–92, 1992–93, 2009–10, 2011–12, 2012–13
Cumberland League 1934–35, 1981–82, 1989–90, 2008–09, 20012-13

References

External links
 Official website
 Kells on the NCL website

1931 establishments in England
BARLA teams
Rugby league teams in Cumbria
English rugby league teams
Rugby clubs established in 1931